Giorgi Latso (born Giorgi Latsabidze, ; 15 April 1978) is a Georgian-American concert pianist, film composer, arranger, adjudicator, improviser and Doctor of Musical Arts. He is listed on the list of famous alumni from USC Thornton School of Music. Latso has won several international piano competitions and awards. He is best known for his interpretations of Chopin and Debussy. His concerts have been broadcast on radio and television in Europe, Asia, and the Americas. 
Latso has served on the faculty of many of the most prestigious festivals and is increasingly in demand for his insightful masterclasses at leading universities across the globe. Many of his students are prize winners of international piano competitions. He currently resides in Los Angeles, California.

Early life and studies
Latso was born in Tbilisi (Georgia) where he started studying the piano at the age of six. He made his public debut at age eight. He was admitted at the Tbilisi State Conservatoire, where he eventually became a pupil of Rusudan Chojava. In 2004, he obtained a master's degree at the Hochschule für Musik, Theater und Medien Hannover, Germany and the Mozarteum in Salzburg, Austria. Latso pursued doctoral studies at the University of Southern California in Los Angeles under the mentoring of Stewart L. Gordon.

Career
He has appeared at major festival venues in Salzburg, Vienna, Berlin, Mannheim, Florence, Lisbon, Beijing, Honolulu, Arturo Benedetti Michelangeli International Piano Festival and Monte-Carlo Piano Masters, among others, and has performed as a recitalist throughout the world. His concerts often feature his own compositions and virtuoso transcriptions.

After his performance of Beethoven's Emperor Concerto at WUK Kulturhaus, he was described in the Austrian press as "...a technically brilliant pianist imbued with a poignant lyricism and genuine profundity." England Rhinegold Classical Magazine said his recording of Debussy's Préludes showed "...extraordinary imagination and a musical tone rarely heard.

Latso composed the score for the film Waltz-Fantasy for which he won an award at the Bologna Film Festival in Italy in 2000.  His compositions also include Variations on a Theme of J. S. Bach and Cyber Moment for violin and piano, which was commissioned and world premiered by the composer in Wigmore Hall, London in 2010.

Among Latso's recordings are Chopin's 24 Études, 24 Preludes and four Scherzos; J.S. Bach's Goldberg Variations; Liszt's 12 Transcendental Études; and Debussy's Preludes, Book 2.

He has worked with musicians including Ernest Fleischmann, Christian Altenburger, Gianluigi Gelmetti, Jansug Kakhidze, David L. Wen, Irmina Trynkos, Friedrich Kleinhapl, Ivo Pogorelić, Yundi Li, Freddy Kempf and Joaquín Soriano, etc.

Latso gave several benefit concerts, including concerts held in the National Theater & Concert Hall, Taipei City, Vienna Ehrbar Concert Hall, Teatro Colón in Bogota, Guido-Feger Concert Hall under the patronage of Princess Marie Aglaë of Liechtenstein. Volksblatt wrote: "Within the romantic repertoire you can with full justification call him a magnificent pianist and a magician of impeccable technique".

Latso has recorded a CD of the complete works for piano and violin by composer Ignatz Waghalter for Naxos Records, with the London Royal Philharmonic Orchestra, Irmina Trynkos and Alexander Walker.

He has given broadcast performances on both radio and television in the United States, Europe, Asia and elsewhere. Latso was listed in the 65th edition of Who's Who in America, and Who's Who in American Art 2011. Since 2011 he has been a member of Pi Kappa Lambda.

In 2012, he was invited by Pope Benedict XVI to his residence in Vatican City to perform the Mozart piano concerto No. 21 with the Vienna Philharmonic at the Basilica di Santa Maria Maggiore in Rome.
Latso made his debut at the Berliner Philharmonie concert hall in Berlin in 2012, and debut at the Slovak Philharmonic concert hall in Bratislava in 2014.

2013, he was invited by Marie, Princess of Liechtenstein, to move to Vienna, where he resided until 2019. He gave masterclasses and lectures at universities nationwide. Latso regularly serves on competition jury panels and has been a conference artist for several music teachers associations. From 2015 to 2018 he was a guest professor at the Conservatori Superior de Música del Liceu in Barcelona, Spain. Latso has been giving masterclasses for years at some of the world’s most prestigious music schools including the Tchaikovsky Moscow Conservatory, Hong Kong Academy for the Performing Arts, National University of Colombia Mozarteum University of Salzburg, Vienna Conservatory of Music, Conservatori Superior de Música del Liceu, University of Southern California, San Francisco Conservatory of Music, Oberlin Conservatory of Music, and the Tokyo University of the Arts.

2013, Latso formed The Latsos Piano Duo with his wife Anna Fedorova-Latso. Since then, they have been performing four-hands piano recitals and concertos for two pianos worldwide as a piano duo and have appeared at musical centres and festivals as well as in scholarly conferences in Europe, Russia, America, and Asia. One of their concert presentation, held at the historic Doheny Estate & Gardens Beverly Hills as part of the Music in the Mansion Series, was filmed by Beverly Hills Warner Cable Television and live-streamed on BHTV10 Channel. The duo supports the mission of charities by organizing and performing benefit concerts. They offer concert performances for non-profit organizations and institutions that serve underprivileged communities, children with special needs, hospital patients, and the elderly. In May 2019 with National Solidarity Fund and The Embassy of Georgia to the Republic of Austria, they performed gala charity concert supporting children and young people suffering from oncological disease in Georgia.

His 2020 performance with National Symphony Orchestra of Colombia in Teatro Colón was reviewed in the Diario gratuito ADN Colombia as: ″...his piano playing that combines technical wizardry with poetic lyricism sometimes sounds as mighty as the 100 member orchestra. Latsos' clarity of articulation, his warm, soft-grained tone, and his virtuosity was so formidable as to be unnoticeable.″

In April 2021 Giorgi Latso is being named an honorary Ambassador of the Los Angeles Philharmonic International Committee. In 2022 he received International Adjudicator Award 2022 at the Asia Pacific International Arts Festival, Book of Records, in Kuala Lumpur, Malaysia.

Influences
Latso has mentioned the following pianists as having inspired him: "Of those whom I heard on the stage, I'd like to name first of all Maria João Pires. Judging by the records, it was Rachmaninoff, Sofronitsky, and Lipatti. As to aesthetics, I feel most close to Vladimir Horowitz."

Honors & Awards

 Yehudi Menuhin Federation Competition in Salzburg, Austria
  Young Artist International Piano Competition in Los Angeles
 Ennio Porrino International Competition in Italy
 Rubinstein International Competition in France
 Beverly Hills National Auditions  
 Vladimir Spivakov Award (Moscow virtuosi) in 2001 
 Georgian Presidential Prize in 1999/2002, 
 German Marion Dönhoff Trust Award in 2002, DAAD,
 German Academic Exchange Award in 2004
 Music Teachers National Association (MTNA) Academic Achievement Recognition of Excellence Award in 2004
 Herbert Batliner Trust Award in 2005
 USC Keyboard Studies Department Award in 2007 and 2011
 American philanthropist Carol Hogel Music Scholarship in 2008
 H.S.H. Princess Marie Aglaë of Liechtenstein
 Honoured as a Steinway Artist by Steinway & Sons in New York City in January 2013 
 Honorary member of the Los Angeles Philharmonic International Committee, 2021 
 International Adjudicator Award, Malaysia Gold Award Ceremony 2022, Book of Records, in Kuala Lumpur, Malaysia in October 2022

Teaching career

Latso has presented master classes and concert performances throughout Central and Eastern Europe, Asia, South America and United States. His musical career includes being a concert pianist and collaborative artist, a professor and an international juror. From 2007 until 2010, he served as president to the USC chapter of the MTNA at the USC Thornton School of Music in Los Angeles. In 2010, Latso served as chairman for the International Piano Performance Examination Committee in Taiwan, (Republic of China). He has taught at the University of Southern California, Azusa Pacific University, at Glendale Community College. He held professorship from 2013-2020 at the Vienna Prayner Conservatory of Music and Dramatic Arts in Vienna, Austria.
In the United States he is a frequent presenter at state and local conferences of Music Teachers National Association, universities, and local music teaching groups.

Recordings

Latso has participated in numerous recordings and television productions, including DVDs and CDs of compositions by Bach, Beethoven, Mozart, Chopin, Schumann, Liszt, Rachmaninoff, Debussy, Stravinsky, and Schoenberg.

His recordings include:
 2005: DVD: ; DVD documentary on Latsabidze in Salzburg, K-TV Austria.
 2006: DVD: Original music score composed by Latsabidze for the film Twilight's Grace, Los Angeles.
 2008: CD: Johannes Brahms: The Piano Quintet in F minor, Op. 34. Hurb Production Studio.
 2009: CD: Schumann: Frauenliebe und -leben; Debussy: Ariettes oubliées. IG Initiatives LLC
 2009: CD/DVD: Latsabidze: The Recital; Onward Entertainment, Los Angeles.
 2010: DVD: The IG-Duo performs works by Szymanowski, Brahms, Bizet-Waxman, Latsabidze. Red Piranha Films. Wigmore Hall, UK.
 2010: CD/DVD: Giorgi Latsabidze plays Claude Debussy; 12 Préludes (Book II). Charismartist Int. Rec.
 2011: DVD: Mozart Piano Concerto No. 21 in C major, K. 467. Taiwan Production
 2011: CD/DVD: Frédéric Chopin: 24 Preludes, Op. 28; Robert Schumann: Kreisleriana, Op. 16. Goyette Records Co.
 2011: CD: Giorgi Latsabidze: The Composer & Transcriber. Rhapsody Library Records
 2012: CD: Waghalter, I.: Violin Concerto / Rhapsody / Violin Sonata (Royal Philharmonic Orchestra, Trynkos, Latsabidze, A. Walker). Naxos Records
 2013: DVD: documentary: Piano for Piggies and Hubbard Hall Project General Films, New York.
 2014: CD: Latso plays Debussy's Estampes & Images (1ere série). Ross Management & Productions. 
 2016: CD:  Chopin: 4 Scherzi. 
 2017: CD:  Giorgi Latso - "Der Pianist". 
 2019: "The Latsos Piano Duo" - Documentary film featured by Beverly Hills Warner Cable Television.

Performances are available via social networking sites of Latso's interpretation of Mozart's Piano Concerto No. 21; Chopin's 24 Preludes, Op. 28; Liszt's 12 Transcendental Études, Horowitz's Carmen Variations (White House Edition), Claude Debussy's Préludes (Book II), Sousa-Horowitz-Latsabidze's "The Stars and Stripes Forever".

References

External links

Latso's official website
Duo The Latsos official website
Latso on Steinway Artist's page
Piano Faculty at Vienna Conservatory, Austria

 USC Notable Keyboard Studies Alumni

University of Southern California alumni
USC Thornton School of Music alumni
Hochschule für Musik, Theater und Medien Hannover alumni
American film score composers
University of Southern California faculty
Azusa Pacific University faculty
Classical pianists from Georgia (country)
1978 births
Living people
Musicians from Tbilisi
Georgian emigrants to the United States
American classical pianists
Male classical pianists
American male pianists
American people of Georgian (country) descent
21st-century classical pianists
American male film score composers
21st-century American male musicians
21st-century American pianists